St. Christopher's School is the name of several schools around the world, including:

St. Christopher's School, Bristol, UK
St. Christopher's School, Bahrain
St. Christopher's School (Harare), Zimbabwe
St. Christopher's School, Richmond, Virginia, USA
St. Christopher's School, Metairie, Louisiana, USA
St. Christopher's School, Nairobi, Kenya
St. Christopher Parish School, California, USA